Flyover is a 2021 Indian Bengali language thriller film directed by Abhimanyu Mukherjee stars Koel Mallick, Gaurav Chakrabarty, Ravi Shaw, Shantilal Mukherjee, Koushik Roy, Poulomi Das in lead roles. The film is written by Abhimanyu Mukherjee and produced by Nispal Singh under the banner of Surinder Films. The film an official remake of the 2016 Kannada film U Turn. It was released on 2 April 2021.

Plot 
Bidisha, a young lady journalist, is preparing a story on traffic rule violations. While crossing the flyover she contacts with a footpath inhabitant for information about the rule breaker. One night, police arrest her for murder.

Cast 
 Koel Mullick as Bidisha
 Gaurav Chakrabarty as SI Amit Sen
 Shantilal Mukherjee as ACP
 Koushik Roy as Palash Bose
 Poulomi Das
 Ravi Shaw as Ranjan, Bidisha's boyfriend

Soundtrack

References

External links 
 

2020s Bengali-language films
2021 thriller films
Bengali-language Indian films
Bengali remakes of Kannada films
Films scored by Anupam Roy
Films shot in Kolkata
Indian thriller films